The 2015 CAF Beach Soccer Championship, also known as the 2015 Africa Beach Soccer Cup of Nations, was a beach soccer tournament which took place in Roche Caiman, Seychelles on 14–19 April 2015. This was the first time that the CAF Beach Soccer Championship was held in Seychelles. All matches were played at the Roche Caiman Sports Complex.

As well as crowning the best beach soccer nation in Africa, the tournament served as the FIFA Beach Soccer World Cup qualifier for teams from Africa which are members of CAF, where the top two teams qualified for the 2015 FIFA Beach Soccer World Cup in Portugal. In the final, Madagascar defeated Senegal to be crowned champions, and both teams qualified for the 2015 FIFA Beach Soccer World Cup.

Qualification

The 2015 CAF Beach Soccer Championship qualifying rounds decided the participating teams of the final tournament.

Qualification ties are played on a home-and-away two-legged basis. If the sides are level on aggregate after the second leg, the away goals rule is applied, and if still level, the tie proceeds directly to a penalty shoot-out (no extra time is played).

Entrants
A total of 19 teams entered the qualifying rounds.

First round
The first legs were scheduled for 13–15 February 2015, and the second legs were scheduled for 20–22 February 2015.

|}
Note: Tunisia and Cameroon withdrew. Sudan and Djibouti were to play a one-off match in Cairo, Egypt, but Sudan withdrew.

Second round
The first legs were scheduled for 13–15 March 2015, and the second legs were scheduled for 20–22 March 2015.

The seven winners of the second round qualified for the final tournament, where they were joined by the hosts Seychelles.

|}
Note: Libya withdrew. Djibouti and Morocco played a one-off match in Casablanca, Morocco. Madagascar and South Africa played both matches in Durban, South Africa as the beach venue at Mahajanga was rendered unplayable by several days of rain. Mali and Senegal were to play both matches in Dakar, Senegal, but Mali withdrew.

Qualified teams and draw
The following eight teams qualified for the final tournament.

 (hosts)

The draw of the tournament was held on 5 April 2015, 16:00 local time (UTC+2), at Cairo. The eight teams were drawn into two groups of four teams, with the following seeding:

Group stage
Each team earns three points for a win in regulation time, two points for a win in extra time, one point for a win in a penalty shoot-out, and no points for a defeat.

All times are local, Seychelles Time (UTC+4).

Group A

Group B

Knockout stage

Bracket

Fifth place semi-finals

Semi-finals

Seventh place match

Fifth place match

Third place match

Final

Final ranking

Awards

Top goalscorers
17 goals
 Alexander Adjei

9 goals
 Emeka Hego Ogbonna

8 goals

 Tokiniaina Francegal Randriamampandry
 Flavien Razafimahatratra
 Azeez Abu

7 goals
 Isiaka Olawale

5 goals

 Mohamed Gamal Hassan
 N'guessan Daniel Kouassitchi
 Pape Amadou Kamara

References

External links
, beachsoccer.com
, CAFonline.com
, FIFA.com

Qualification CAF
2015
2015 in beach soccer